ASSC may refer to:

 Association for the Scientific Study of Consciousness
 Airborne Special Service Company, a special forces unit of the Republic of China Army
 Airport Surface Surveillance Capability, designed to reduce the possibility of runway incursions at airports
 Aviation Section, U.S. Signal Corps, the aerial warfare service of the United States from 1914 to 1918
 Anti Social Social Club, clothing brand in Los Angeles
 Aylesford School – Sports College, a secondary school in Kent, England
 The amiloride sensitive sodium channel, also called Epithelial sodium channel (ENaC)
 Areas of Special State Concern, a Croatian government designation for regional development

See also 
 Advancement of Sound Science Center